Auerbachia is a genus of cnidarians belonging to the family Auerbachiidae.

The species of this genus are found in Australia.

Species:

Auerbachia anomala 
Auerbachia caranxi 
Auerbachia chaetodoni 
Auerbachia chakravartyi 
Auerbachia chorinemusi 
Auerbachia hepatica 
Auerbachia monstrosa 
Auerbachia pulchra 
Auerbachia scomberoidi

References

Bivalvulida
Marine fauna of Australia
Invertebrates of Australia